A flagellate is a cell or organism with one or more whip-like appendages called flagella. The word flagellate also describes a particular construction (or level of organization) characteristic of many prokaryotes and eukaryotes and their means of motion. The term presently does not imply any specific relationship or classification of the organisms that possess flagella. However, the term "flagellate" is included in other terms (such as "dinoflagellate" and "choanoflagellata") which are more formally characterized.

Form and behavior 
Flagella in eukaryotes are supported by microtubules in a characteristic arrangement, with nine fused pairs surrounding two central singlets. These arise from a basal body. In some flagellates, flagella direct food into a cytostome or mouth, where food is ingested.  Flagella often support hairs, called mastigonemes, or contain rods. Their ultrastructure plays an important role in classifying eukaryotes.

Among protoctists and microscopic animals, a flagellate is an organism with one or more flagella. Some cells in other animals may be flagellate, for instance the spermatozoa of most animal phyla. Flowering plants do not produce flagellate cells, but ferns, mosses, green algae, and some gymnosperms and closely related plants do so. Likewise, most fungi do not produce cells with flagellae, but the primitive fungal chytrids do. Many protists take the form of single-celled flagellates.

Flagella are generally used for propulsion. They may also be used to create a current that brings in food.  In most such organisms, one or more flagella are located at or near the anterior of the cell, e.g., Euglena.  Often there is one directed forwards and one trailing behind. Among animals, fungi, which are part of a group called the opisthokonts, there is a single posterior flagellum. They are from the phylum Mastigophora. They can cause diseases and are typically heterotrophic. They reproduce by binary fission. They spend most of their existence moving or feeding. Many parasites that affect human health or economy are flagellates. Flagellates are the major consumers of primary and secondary production in aquatic ecosystems - consuming bacteria and other protists.

Flagellates as specialized cells or life cycle stages 

An overview of the occurrence of flagellated cells in eukaryote groups, as specialized cells of multicellular organisms or as life cycle stages, is given below (see also the article flagellum):
 Archaeplastida: most green algae (zoospores and male gametes, except in Zygnematophyceae), bryophytes (male gametes), pteridophytes (male gametes), some gymnosperms (cycads and Ginkgo, as male gametes)
 Stramenopiles: centric diatoms (male gametes), brown algae (zoospores and gametes), oomycetes (assexual zoospores and gametes), hyphochytrids (zoospores), labyrinthulomycetes (zoospores), some chrysophytes, some xanthophytes, eustigmatophytes
 Alveolata: some apicomplexans (gametes)
 Rhizaria: some radiolarians (probably gametes), foraminiferans (as gametes)
 Cercozoa: plasmodiophoromycetes (zoospores and gametes), chlorarachniophytes (zoospores)
 Amoebozoa: myxogastrids
 Opisthokonta: most metazoans (male gametes, epithelia and choanocytes), chytrid fungi (zoospores and gametes)
 Excavata: some acrasids (Pocheina, as zoospores)

Flagellates as organisms: the Flagellata
In older classifications, flagellated protozoa were grouped in Flagellata (= Mastigophora), sometimes divided into Phytoflagellata (= Phytomastigina, mostly autotrophic) and Zooflagellata (= Zoomastigina, heterotrophic). They were sometimes grouped with Sarcodina (ameboids) in the group Sarcomastigophora.

The autotrophic flagellates were grouped similarly to the botanical schemes used for the corresponding algae groups. The colourless flagellates were customary grouped in three groups, highly artificial:
 Protomastigineae, in which absorption of food-particles in holozoic nutrition occurs at a localised point of the cell surface, often at  a cytostome, although many groups were merely saprophytes; it included the majority of colourless flagellates, and even many "apochlorotic" algae;
 Pantostomatineae (or Rhizomastigineae), in which the absorption takes place at any point on the cell surface; roughly corresponds to "amoeboflagellates";
 Distomatineae, a group of binucleate "double individuals" with symmetrically distributed flagella and, in many species, two symmetrical mouths; roughly corresponds to current Diplomonadida.

Presently, these groups are known to be highly polyphyletic. In modern classifications of the protists, the principal flagellated taxa are placed in the following eukaryote groups, which include also non-flagellated forms (A: autotrophic; F: free-living heterotrophic; P: parasitic; S: symbiotic):
 Archaeplastida: volvocids (A/F), prasinophytes (A), glaucophytes (A)
 Stramenopiles: bicosoecids (F), proteromonads (F), opalines (F), most chrysophytes (A/F), part of xanthophytes (A), raphidophytes/chloromonads (A), silicoflagellates (A), ciliophryids (F), pedinellids (A/F)
 Alveolata: dinoflagellates (A/F), Colpodella (F)
 Rhizaria
 Cercozoa: cercomonads (F), spongomonads (F), thaumatomonads (F), glissomonads (F), cryomonads (F), heliomonads/dimorphids (F), ebriids (F)
 Amoebozoa: Multicilia (F), phalansteriids (F), some archamoebae (F/S)
 Opisthokonta: choanoflagellates (F)
 Excavata
 Discoba: jakobids (F), kinetoplastids (bodonids, F/P, trypanosomatids, P), euglenids (F/A), some heteroloboseans (P/F/S)
 Metamonada: diplomonads (P/F), retortamonads (S), Preaxostyla/anaeromonads  (oxymonads, S, Trimastix, F),  parabasalids (trichomonads, P/S, hypermastigids, S)
 Eukaryota incertae sedis : haptophytes (F/A), cryptophytes (F/A), kathablepharids (F), Apusozoa (apusomondas, F, ancyromonads, F, spironemids/hemimastigids, F), collodictyonids/diphylleids (F), Phyllomonas (F), and about a hundred genera

Although the taxonomic group Flagellata was abandoned, the term "flagellate" is still used as the description of a level of organization and also as an ecological functional group. Another term used is "monadoid", from monad. as in  Monas, and Cryptomonas and in the groups as listed above.

The amoeboflagellates (e.g., the rhizarian genus Cercomonas, some amoebozoan Archamoebae, some excavate Heterolobosea) have a peculiar type of flagellate/amoeboid organization, in which cells may present flagella and pseudopods, simultaneously or sequentially, while the helioflagellates (e.g., the cercozoan heliomonads/dimorphids, the stramenopile pedinellids and ciliophryids) have a flagellate/heliozoan organization.

References

External links

 
 Leadbeater, B.S.C. & Green, J.C., eds. (2000). The Flagellates. Unity, diversity and evolution. Taylor and Francis, London.
 

Cell biology
 
Microbiology